Narrabri railway station is located on the Mungindi line in New South Wales, Australia. It serves the town of Narrabri, opening on 1 April 1897 when the line was extended from Boggabri to Moree. Improvements were made to the station in 1920, with the shunting yard increased in size and the platform lengthened by sixty feet.

Services
Narrabri is served by NSW TrainLink's daily Northern Tablelands Xplorer service operating between Moree and Sydney. NSW TrainLink also operate a coach service from Narrabri to Burren Junction.

References

Easy Access railway stations in New South Wales
North West Slopes
Railway stations in Australia opened in 1897
Regional railway stations in New South Wales